The Other One may refer to:

 The Other One (TV series), a 2017 British television comedy series starring Ellie White and Lauren Socha
 The Other One (1977 TV series), a British television comedy series starring Richard Briers and Michael Gambon
 The Other One (album), a 1979 album by Bob Welch
 The Other One (film), a 2008 French drama film
 La Otra (film), a 1945 Mexican drama film
 "The Other One", a song on the 1968 album Anthem of the Sun by the Grateful Dead
The Other One: The Long Strange Trip of Bob Weir, a 2015 documentary film about Bob Weir

See also

 The Other Ones